Craspedophorus is a genus of beetles in the family Carabidae.

List of species
Craspedophorus contains the following 179 species:

References

Panagaeinae